Xenisthmus africanus, also known as the flathead wriggler or African wriggler, is a species of fish in the Xenisthmidae (wriggler) family, which is regarded as a synonymous with the Eleotridae,. It is found in the Indian Ocean, ranging from the coast of east Africa and to the islands in the western Indian Ocean. It has a flatter head than most other wrigglers.

References

africanus
Fish described in 1958
Fish of the Indian Ocean